The Leyenda de Plata (2000) was professional wrestling tournament produced by the Mexican wrestling promotion Consejo Mundial de Lucha Libre (CMLLl; Spanish "World Wrestling Council") that ran from September 22, 2000, over the course of three of CMLL's Friday night shows in Arena México with the finals on October 6, 2000. The annual Leyenda de Plata tournament is held in honor of lucha libre legend El Santo and is one of CMLL's most important annual tournaments.

The third annual Leyenda de Plata started with a 16-man torneo cibernetico elimination match. Unlike in 1998 and 1999, CMLL added a semi-final match to the tournament as the last two wrestlers in the cibernetico would meet in a singles match the following week. The semi-finalists were Dr. Wagner Jr. and Negro Casas, outlasting Antifaz del Norte, Atlantis, Astro Rey Jr., Black Warrior, Blue Panther, El Felino, Fuerza Guerrera, Olímpico, Rey Bucanero, Safari, Satánico, Scorpio Jr., Tarzan Boy and Zumbido. The two survivors faced off in a singles match the following week, which Negro Casas won. On October 6, 2000, Negro Casas defeated El Hijo del Santo to win the 2000 Leyenda de Plata.

Production

Background
The Leyenda de Plata (Spanish for "the Silver Legend") is an annual lucha libre tournament scripted and promoted by the Mexican professional wrestling promotion Consejo Mundial de Lucha Libre (CMLL).  The first Leyenda de Plata was held in 1998 and was in honor of El Santo, nicknamed Enmáscarado de Plata (the Silver mask) from which the tournament got its name. The trophy given to the winner is a plaque with a metal replica of the mask that El Santo wore in both wrestling and lucha films.

The Leyenda de Plata was held annually until 2003, at which point El Santo's son, El Hijo del Santo left CMLL on bad terms. The tournament returned in 2004 and has been held on an almost annual basis since then. The original format of the tournament was the Torneo cibernetico elimination match to qualify for a semi-final. The winner of the semi-final would face the winner of the previous year's tournament in the final. Since 2005 CMLL has held two cibernetico matches and the winner of each then meet in the semi-final. In 2011, the tournament was modified to eliminate the final stage as the previous winner, Místico, did not work for CMLL at that point in time

Storylines
The events featured a number of professional wrestling matches with different wrestlers involved in pre-existing scripted feuds, plots and storylines. Wrestlers were portrayed as either heels (referred to as rudos in Mexico, those that portray the "bad guys") or faces (técnicos in Mexico, the "good guy" characters) as they followed a series of tension-building events, which culminated in a wrestling match or series of matches.

Results

September 22, 2000

September 29, 2000

October 6, 2000

References

2000 in professional wrestling
Leyenda de Plata
Events in Mexico City
October 2000 events in Mexico